Our Darling is an album by Altamont, which was the last record released was by Man's Ruin Records in 2001.

Track listing
"Saint Of All Killers" – 4:42
"Short Eyes" – 2:20
"Our Darling" – 4:37
"Pirate Love" (Johnny Thunders) – 3:23
"Chicken Lover" – 3:05
"Dead Car" – 3:26
"Swami" – 3:51
"Peace Creep" – 3:05
"Stripey Hole" – 5:47
"Young Man Blues" (Mose Allison) – 9:01
"Hell's Angel Lullaby" – 2:06

Personnel
Dale Crover – Organ, Bass, Guitar, Percussion, Baritone, Vocals
Joey Osbourne – Drums, Music box, Vocals
Dan Southwick – Bass
Tim Green – Engineer, Producer
Sandris Rutmanis – Photography
John Golden – Mastering

Altamont (band) albums
2001 albums
Man's Ruin Records albums